Hartmut Fromm (born 15 October 1950) is a retired German football defender.

References

External links
 

1950 births
Living people
German footballers
Bundesliga players
2. Bundesliga players
VfL Bochum players
SC Westfalia Herne players
Place of birth missing (living people)
Association football defenders